The Archdiocese of Davao (Latin: Archidioecesis Davaensis) is an ecclesiastical jurisdiction of the Catholic Church in the Philippines. It is a metropolitan see in southern Mindanao. The archdiocese comprises the city of Davao, The Island Garden City of Samal, and the municipality of Talaingod, Davao del Norte in Davao del Norte.

Under its jurisdiction are the three suffragan dioceses of Digos, Tagum, and Mati the capital cities of the three Davao provinces.

History

The beginnings of the Archdiocese started with the arrival of the Augustinian Recollects in 1848 followed by the Jesuits soon after.

Its official beginnings came during its establishment as a Prelature Nullius on December 17, 1949 having the Archdiocese of Cebu as its Metropolitan. It was elevated into a diocese on July 11, 1966, and eventually became an archdiocese on June 29, 1970 taking as its titular patron St. Peter the Apostle whose feast day is celebrated also on June 29.

The official name given to the ecclesiastical jurisdiction is "Archidioecesis Davaensis" and San Pedro Cathedral Parish as the seat of the Archbishop.

On December 29, 1954, Clovis Thibault, P.M.E. was appointed as prelate of the Prelature of Davao. He was a priest of the Foreign Mission Society of Quebec. He became the first bishop and archbishop when the prelature was elevated into a diocese and later into an archdiocese. Antonio Lloren Mabutas, a native of Agoo, La Union, succeeded him on December 9, 1972. He was then succeeded by Fernando Capalla who first became Coadjutor Archbishop on June 28, 1994 and became its archbishop on November 6, 1996. The current archbishop of Davao is Romulo Valles, who was appointed in 2012.

Ordinaries

Archbishops

Auxiliary bishops
 Fernando Capalla (1975–1977)
 Pedro Rosales Dean (1977–1980)
 Generoso Cambronero Camiña, P.M.E. † (1978–1979)
 Patricio Hacbang Alo (1981–1984)
 Juan de Dios Mataflorida Pueblos † (1985–1987)
 Alfredo Banluta Baquial † (1988–1993)
 Guillermo Dela Vega Afable (2001–2002)
 George Beluso Rimando (2006–present)

Suffragan dioceses

Diocese of Digos
Diocese of Mati
Diocese of Tagum

Statistics
As of 2019

 Total Population – 1,816,529
 Catholic Population – 1,498,149
 Diocesan Priests – 74
 Religious Priests – 88
 Male Religious – 354
 Female Religious – 552
 Parishes – 39
 Vicariates – 7
 Catholic educational institutions – 3 seminaries, 2 universities, 6 colleges, and 14 high schools

See also
Roman Catholicism in the Philippines

References

External links

Archdiocese of Davao - CBCP Online
Archdiocese of Davao - Catholic Hierarchy Website
Catholic Bishops Conference of the Philippines
Most Rev. Fernando R. Capalla, D.D., Archbishop of Davao
Archdiocese of Davao - Official Website

Roman Catholic dioceses in the Philippines
Archdiocese
Christian organizations established in 1970
Roman Catholic dioceses and prelatures established in the 20th century
Religion in Davao del Sur
Davao City